Lycée Français Molière de Saragosse is a French international school in Zaragoza, Spain. It serves levels primaire maternelle/infantil (preschool) until lycée/bachillerato (senior high school/sixth form college).

Students begin a multilingual education programme, covering French, Castillian Spanish, and English, at age 3. In 2017 Muriel Fabre, the director of the nursery and primary school, stated that the school emphasises concepts rather than memorization and focuses on individual student ability rather than grade levels.

See also

References

External links
  Lycée Français Molière de Saragosse
  Lycée Français Molière de Saragosse
  "Una jornada en el Liceo Francés Molière de Zaragoza." Heraldo de Aragón.

Zaragoza
French international schools in Spain